Lisa Haley is a Grammy-nominated American musician known for her Cajun zydeco music. Her 2007 album King Cake reached #15 on Billboard's World Albums chart.

Early life
Haley is the descendant of Irish immigrants and is related to Bill Haley of Bill Haley & the Comets. She was classically-trained as a violinist, parlaying her knowledge of the instrument into fiddling, a form of music close to her Southern roots.

Career
Haley is a fourth-generation fiddler whose mentors included Grammy-winning zydeco pioneer Queen Ida. With her band, the Zydekats, Haley has played numerous venues and festivals across the world, including NoHo Summer Nights, FolkWorks Folk/Roots Festival, the Annual Orange County Cajun Food & Music Celebration, the Annual Decatur Celebration, the Wildlife West Music Festival, the Simi Valley Cajun & Blues Music Festival, the Rainforest World Music Festival, the Blue Water Music Festival, the Kaleidoscope Art & Music Festival, the Sacramento Music Festival, Redlands Bowl Summer Music Festival, Irvine Global Village Festival, Sawdust Festival, Ragin' Cajun Crawfish Jamboree, Silverado Days Festival, Irmo Okra Strut, Snowy Range Music Festival, Solstice Music Festival, and others.

Personal life
Haley is a practicing Christian.

Discography
Joy Ride (2016)
Absolutely Live! (2016)
Lisa Haley & the Zydekats (2008)
King Cake (2007)
All the Way Live! (2005)
Talking to the Sun (2002)
Louisiana (2001)
Waiting for the Sky...(1997)
Lisa Haley & the Zydekats (1996)

Awards and nominations

References

20th-century American women musicians
21st-century American women musicians
American people of Irish descent
American fiddlers
Cajun musicians
Cajun fiddlers
Zydeco musicians
Year of birth missing (living people)
Living people